Roop County, until 1862 known as Lake County, was a county of Nevada Territory in the United States from 1861 until 1864. It was created in 1861 as one of the original nine counties of Nevada. In 1864 it was succeeded by Lassen County, California and Washoe County, Nevada.

History
In March 1861, Congress created the official Nevada Territory, with the Honey Lake Valley and the area to its north included within its provisional bounds. When this occurred, the border between Nevada and California was poorly defined in Nevada's Organic Act. Later in 1861, Lake County was established in northwestern Nevada, creating a boundary dispute with California. Its name was chosen due to the many lakes in the area, including Honey Lake, Pyramid Lake, and Winnemucca Lake. In 1862 it was renamed Roop County after Isaac Roop, governor of the unofficial "Provisional Territorial Government of Nevada Territory," which had previously existed in the same area. Much of Roop County, including Susanville (named after Roop's daughter), was claimed by California as part of Plumas County. This led to an armed conflict known as the Sagebrush War, the War of Injunctions or the Roop County War.

This resulted in the appointment of a joint California–Nevada boundary survey, with Surveyor-General J.F. Houghton acting for the State of California and Butler Ives, for the Territory of Nevada. The final surveyors report, accepted by California on April 4, 1864, and by Nevada on February 7, 1865, proved that the Honey Lake area and virtually all the population of Roop County was in California. The California portion of Roop County became part of the newly created Lassen County, California, in 1864. The remainder was ceded to Washoe County, Nevada.

See also 

 List of former United States counties
 List of Nevada counties
 Nataqua Territory

References

External links
 The Nevada Observer: History of Roop County
 Nevada Association of Counties: Creation of Nevada's Counties

Former counties of Nevada
1861 establishments in Nevada Territory
Populated places established in 1861
1864 disestablishments in the United States
Populated places disestablished in 1864